Lee Adrian Frost (born 4 December 1957) is an English retired professional footballer who played as a winger in the Football League for Chelsea and Brentford.

Career

Chelsea 
A winger, Frost began his career in the youth system at Second Division club Chelsea, signing his first professional contract in July 1976. He had to wait until 15 April 1978 to make his first team debut, which came with a start in a 2–0 First Division defeat to Aston Villa. Chelsea's relegation at the end of the 1978–79 season opened up a place in the team and he made his first appearance of 1979–80 on 20 October 1979. He scored his first senior goal as 10-man Chelsea beat Cardiff City 2–1. Frost made a name for himself on his following appearance, scoring a hat-trick in a win over Orient on 10 November and following up with another goal in a 2–1 victory over West Ham United. He made semi-regular appearances through to March 1980 and finished the 1979–80 season with five goals in 12 appearances.

Frost made his first appearance of the 1980–81 season on 3 September 1980, with a start in a 1–1 League Cup second round second leg draw with Cardiff City. It proved to be his final appearance for the club and he departed in December 1980, having made 18 appearances and scored five goals during just under two-and-a-half years in the first team squad at Stamford Bridge.

Brentford (loan) 
Frost joined newly promoted Third Division club Brentford on a one-month loan in October 1978. He made six appearances without scoring before his loan expired.

MYPA (loan) 
Frost moved to Finland to join 1. Divisioona club MYPA on loan during the 1980 season. He scored three goals for the club.

Brentford (permanent transfer) 
Frost and Chelsea teammate Gary Johnson joined Brentford permanently in a £15,000 deal in December 1980. Frost scored three goals in 15 appearances before being released at the end of the 1980–81 season.

Non-league football 
After his release from Brentford, Frost dropped into non-league football and appeared for Southern League clubs Addlestone & Weybridge Town and Crawley Town.

Career statistics

References

1957 births
Sportspeople from Woking
English footballers
Brentford F.C. players
English Football League players
Living people
Chelsea F.C. players
Myllykosken Pallo −47 players
Southern Football League players
Association football wingers
Addlestone & Weybridge Town F.C. players
Crawley Town F.C. players
English expatriate footballers
English expatriate sportspeople in Finland
Ykkönen players